Tunis Marine is a railway station in Tunis, the capital of Tunisia, and forms the southern terminus of the standard gauge Tunis-Goulette-Marsa railway or "TGM", which was inaugurated in 1872.
The service depot for the line's trains is adjacent, to the north, reached by a level crossing over Avenue Habib Bourguiba (formerly called ).

Tunis Metro (light rail) routes 1 and 4, also managed by Transtu, terminate nearby and provide services to the city centre, the main railway station, Tunis Gare Centrale, and beyond. Buses from the station serve destinations including Tunis–Carthage International Airport and the Bardo National Museum.

The next station on the TGM line is Le Bac.

References 

Railway stations in Tunisia
Tunis Light Metro